The Belfast Royal Academy  (commonly shortened to ) is the oldest school in the city of Belfast, Northern Ireland. It is a co-educational, non-denominational voluntary grammar school in north Belfast. The Academy is one of 8 schools in Northern Ireland whose Head is a member of the Headmasters' and Headmistresses' Conference.

History 
The Academy was founded in 1785 by James Crombie. Originally situated near St Anne's Parish Church in what is now Academy Street, it moved to its current location on the Cliftonville Road in 1880. For more than a century the school was named Belfast Academy. On 27 November 1887, Queen Victoria granted permission for the school to style itself Belfast Royal Academy, and its name was officially changed in November 1888.

"Barring out" incident 
On 12 April 1792, a group of schoolboys (eight boarders and two day boys) barricaded themselves in the mathematics classroom. In doing so they "declared war against the masters until their requests should be granted". As they expected to be holed up for some time, they had taken a quantity of provisions from the Academy kitchens; further they managed to arm themselves with 5 pistols and a large quantity of gunpowder and shot. A letter, headed “Liberty Hall”, was sent by the students to their masters in which they stated they would not surrender until their demands had been met.
The Academy authorities, in an attempt to break the siege, sent workmen to break down the door and pour water down the chimney, without success, as the boys opened fire on them.
Finally the Sovereign of Belfast, William Bristow, was summoned, he read the Riot Act to the boys but failed to end the barring out, and one of the boys opened fire on him.

The siege ended by negotiation between the governors and the boys soon after; the boys, however, refused to show remorse and were later beaten, all leaving the school shortly following their punishment.

Headmasters 
 James Crombie (1785–1790)
 William Bruce (1790–1822)
 James Gray (1822–1826)
 Reuben John Bryce (1826–1880)
 William Collier (1880–1890)
 T. W. Foster (1890–1898)
 T. R. Collier (1898–1923)
 Alexander Foster (1923–1942)
 John Darbyshire (1943–1968)
 Louis Lord (1968–1980)
 William Sillery (1980–2000)
 William Young (2000–2008)
 Moore Dickson (2009–2017)
 Hilary Woods (2017–present)

School emblem 
The school emblem comprises the rose, the thistle and the shamrock, along with the Royal Coat of Arms of the United Kingdom, the Arms of the City of Belfast and those of the province of Ulster. The three significant dates mark the foundation of the school by James Crombie in 1785, the transfer to the present site in 1880 and the approval by Queen Victoria of the designation Belfast Royal Academy in 1888.

Preparatory department 

The school's preparatory department, Ben Madigan Preparatory School, is located on the Antrim Road in the shadow of Cave Hill. Originally opened in 1829, it moved to its current site in 1965. A pre-prep was opened in 1998.

House system 
When a pupil enters the Academy they are placed into one of the four houses: Shaw, Currie, Pottinger or Cairns, named after past pupils: James Shaw, Donald Currie, Henry Pottinger, and Hugh Cairns, 1st Earl Cairns, for whom the house colours are yellow, green, red, and blue, respectively; each pupil must wear a tie with a stripe of their house colour on it.

Honours system 

As a pupil progresses through the Academy, they can earn honours through excellence in sport and/or the arts. There are minor honours, allowing a pupil to wear a minor honours tie, (green owls) intermediate honours (blue owls) and major honours (gold owls). In addition, a pupil gaining intermediate honours is entitled to wear a black blazer with maroon braid surrounding a golden school badge. A pupil gaining major honours in sport is entitled to wear a distinctive maroon blazer with blue braid and a gold school badge. Pupils who receive major honours in the arts, be it for music, drama, or art & design are entitled to wear a blue blazer with maroon braid and a gold school badge. The honour, e.g. Cricket XI 2004 or Music 2002, is stitched in gold letters under the badge for both intermediate and major honours.

Notable alumni

Sources

References

External links
 Official school website
 Ben Madigan website
 BRA and the Duke of Edinburgh Scheme
 BRA Old Boys' Association

Grammar schools in Belfast
Private schools in Northern Ireland
1785 establishments in Ireland
Member schools of the Headmasters' and Headmistresses' Conference
Grade B1 listed buildings
Preparatory schools in Northern Ireland